Ponting Cliff is an angular cliff that is similar in appearance to Meares Cliff just eastward, located 3 nautical miles (6 km) east of the terminal confluences of the Dennistoun, Nash and Wallis Glaciers on the northern coast of Victoria Land. First charted by the Northern Party, led by Campbell, of the British Antarctic Expedition, 1910–13, which named it for Herbert G. Ponting, photographer of the expedition.

References

Cliffs of Victoria Land
Pennell Coast